Arto Ilmari Koivisto (born 7 December 1947 in Isojoki) is a Finnish former cross-country skier who competed in the 1970s. He won the 4 × 10 km relay gold and the 15 km bronze at the 1976 Winter Olympics in Innsbruck.

Koivisto also won the 15 km event at the Holmenkollen ski festival in 1976.

Doping ban
Koivisto tested positive for ephedrine and codine at the 1981 Finnish Skiing Championships, and lost two bronze medals. He claimed the source of the substances was a cough medicine prescribed to him by a doctor, and he got a one-month sanction from the sport.

Cross-country skiing results
All results are sourced from the International Ski Federation (FIS).

Olympic Games
 2 medals – (1 gold, 1 bronze)

World Championships

World Cup

Season standings

References

External links
 
  
 

1947 births
Living people
People from Isojoki
Cross-country skiers at the 1976 Winter Olympics
Finnish male cross-country skiers
Finnish sportspeople in doping cases
Doping cases in cross-country skiing
Holmenkollen Ski Festival winners
Olympic cross-country skiers of Finland
Olympic gold medalists for Finland
Olympic bronze medalists for Finland
Olympic medalists in cross-country skiing
Medalists at the 1976 Winter Olympics
Sportspeople from South Ostrobothnia